Yang Soo-jin (born 2 September 1988) is a South Korean modern pentathlete. At the 2012 Summer Olympics, she competed in the women's competition, and finished in 24th place with a total score of 4964.

References

1988 births
South Korean female modern pentathletes
Living people
Olympic modern pentathletes of South Korea
Modern pentathletes at the 2012 Summer Olympics
Asian Games medalists in modern pentathlon
Modern pentathletes at the 2010 Asian Games
Modern pentathletes at the 2014 Asian Games
Asian Games gold medalists for South Korea
Asian Games silver medalists for South Korea
Asian Games bronze medalists for South Korea
Medalists at the 2010 Asian Games
Medalists at the 2014 Asian Games
South Korean Buddhists
People from Chuncheon
Sportspeople from Gangwon Province, South Korea